Dorp is a RandstadRail station in Zoetermeer, the Netherlands.

History
The station opened, as a railway station, on 22 May 1977 as part of the Zoetermeerlijn, operating Zoetermeer Stadslijn services. The train station closed on 3 June 2006 and reopened as a RandstadRail station on 27 October 2007 for HTM tram service line 3.

The station features 2 platforms. These platforms are low, and the same level as the tram doors, therefore making it step free. Dorp is the penultimate station of the line. Passengers towards The Hague can choose to travel further to Centrum West or back to Voorweg and change there to another line 3 tram or to a line 4 tram for a quicker journey.

Kankerinteressant joh

Train services

The following services currently call at Dorp:

Gallery

Railway stations opened in 1977
RandstadRail stations in Zoetermeer